American English is a set of dialects of the English language native to the United States.

American English may also refer to:

Linguistics
 General American English, a dialect of American English
 North American English, a set of dialects of the English language spoken in the US and Canada

Demographics
 American English people, English people whose ancestry originates wholly or partly in the US
 English Americans, Americans whose ancestry originates wholly or partly in England

Other uses
 American English (album) by Wax
 "American English" (Wax song), 1987
 "American English" (song) by Idlewild

See also
 American (disambiguation)
 English (disambiguation)
 Americans, people born in US